The Little Channel Range Lights were a set of range lights on Prince Edward Island, Canada. They were built in 1873, and deactivated in 1969; only the rear tower has survived.

See also
 List of lighthouses in Prince Edward Island
 List of lighthouses in Canada

References

External links
Picture of Little Channel Range Rear Light Lighthouse Friends

Lighthouses completed in 1873
Lighthouses in Prince Edward Island